Acanthochitonidae is a family of chitons, marine molluscs in the class Polyplacophora.

Description
These small to large chitons are characterised by a broad girdle with erect tufts of up to ten large bristles. The coarsely granular valves of the shell are partially overlapped by the girdle. This girdle is all covered by coarse spines. The articulating flange, or articulamentum, is well developed. The margin of the cephalic plate has about five slits. The lateral insertion plates all have a single notch.

Genera
According to the World Register of Marine Species (WoRMS) the following genera are included in this family 
 Acanthochitona  Gray, 1821
 Amycula
 Bassethullia Pilsbry, 1928
 Choneplax Carpenter MS, Dall, 1882
 Craspedochiton Shuttleworth, 1853
 Craspedoplax Iredale & Hull, 1925
 Cryptoconchus de Blainville MS, Burrow, 1815
 Leptoplax Carpenter MS, Dall, 1882
 Notoplax H. Adams, 1861
 Pseudotonicia Ashby, 1928

References

 Vaught, K.C. (1989). A classification of the living Mollusca. American Malacologists: Melbourne, FL (USA). . XII, 195 pp

 
Mollusc families